Robert or Bob Spears may refer to:

Robert Spears (minister) (1825–1899), British Unitarian minister
Robert Spears (cyclist) (1893–1950), Australian cyclist
Robert Spears (naturopath) (1894–1969), naturopath
Robert R. Spears Jr. (1908–2008), American Christian clergyman

See also
Robert Spear (disambiguation)